Mascardi Lake is in the lake region of northern Patagonia in Río Negro Province of Argentina. The lake is near the resort city of Bariloche and is within the Nahuel Huapi National Park. The lake, of glacial origin, is named after Nicolás Mascardi, a 17th-century Jesuit who was a missionary in the area.

Description
Mascardi Lake is V-shaped with two arms roughly equal in length and width. The eastern arm is called the Catedral (Cathedral) arm and the western arm is called the Tronador arm, named after the volcano on the border with Chile which is the highest and most prominent mountain in the area. The mountains are snow-capped most of the year. Timberline on the mountains is above .

The Manso emerges from the southwestern corner lake via a short, turbulent passage called "Los Rapidos" (The Rapids) which leads to the Las Moscas Lake, the next in a chain of lakes along the Manso River.

A paved highway (National Route 40) extends down the eastern arm of the lake to the southern shore where a small community called Villa Mascardi is located. From there a road (unpaved in 2018) named Route 82 follows the western arm of the lake northward and continues on to Ventisquero Negro.

Recreation
Kayaking and fishing are popular on Mascardi Lake with a number of tourist agencies in Bariloche offering guided tours. Species sought by fishermen are rainbow, brown, and brook trout, none of them native to Argentina. A number of campgrounds and lodging places are found along the roads that encircle one-half the lake.  One of the campgrounds on the northernmost part of the Catedral arm is owned by a community of Mapuche people who were the principal occupants of this area from the 17th until the late 19th century.

The trail is rated moderate in difficulty.

References

Lakes of Río Negro Province
Glacial lakes of Argentina
Nahuel Huapi National Park